Henoc Pierrick Bofenda better known by his stage name Leto is a French rapper and part of the duo PSO Thug, a French hip-hop duo from the 17th arrondissement of Paris. PSO part refers to their origin as they come from Porte de Saint-Ouen (aka PSO) and is made up of Leto alongside Aéro. In 2014 they started with "Hors la loi". In February 2015, they published the precursor to their mixtape, entitled En attendant Demoniak. The duo released their first mixtape named Demoniak on May 20, 2016, and sell 1,319 copies in its first week of release.

Signed with Rec. 118, an affiliation of Warner Music France, Leto has pursued besides his collaboration with Aero in PSO Thug, his own solo career by releasing two separate mixtapes Trap$tar and Trap$tar 2 in 2018 and 2019 respectively. Trap$tar 2 had given a collaboration with Ninho in "Tes parents" giving him a charting hit in the Top 20 in France.  In 2020 he released his EP Virus as an "avant-album" in preparation of a major release scheduled later this year. with "Train de vie" featuring rapper PLK reaching as high as #11 on the French charts. He is collaborating with Cheu-B, part of group XVBarbar now known since 2019 as XV.

Discography

Albums

EPs

Mixtapes
As PSO Thug
Demoniak (2016)
Pause (2018)

Solo

Singles
As part of PSO Thug
2016: "Plein les poches" (featuring Sadek) - Reached #184 in the French Singles chart

Solo

*Did not appear in the official Belgian Ultratop 50 charts, but rather in the bubbling under Ultratip charts.

Other charting songs

*Did not appear in the official Belgian Ultratop 50 charts, but rather in the bubbling under Ultratip charts.

Featured in

*Did not appear in the official Belgian Ultratop 50 charts, but rather in the bubbling under Ultratip charts.

References 

French rappers
Living people
Year of birth missing (living people)